Dennis Lipscomb (March 1, 1942 – July 30, 2014) was an American actor. 

Lipscomb's first feature film was Union City (1980). From the early 1980s to the 1990s, Lipscomb appeared in key roles in various motion pictures including Love Child (1982), WarGames (1983), Eyes of Fire (1983), The Day After (1983), A Soldier's Story (1984), Crossroads (1986), Amazing Grace and Chuck (1987), Retribution (1987), Sister, Sister (1987), The First Power (1990) and Under Siege (1992). Lipscomb also had a recurring role as mayor of the fictitious town of Sparta, Mississippi in the first season of In the Heat of the Night (1988). In more recent years, Lipscomb has guest starred on television commercials and shows, including WKRP In Cincinnati, T.J. Hooker, and Wiseguy (1987; CBS) as Sid Royce/Elvis Prim. To a younger audience he is perhaps best known as DCI Peter Sterling in Spycraft: The Great Game.

Filmography

References

External links

Dennis Lipscomb at Internet Off-Broadway Database

1942 births
Male actors from New York (state)
20th-century American male actors
American male film actors
American male television actors
2014 deaths
People from Westbury, New York